Klaus Zähringer (born 17 October 1939) is a German sport shooter. He was born in Königsberg. He won a bronze medal in 50 metre rifle three positions event at the 1960 Summer Olympics in Rome.

References

1939 births
Living people
Sportspeople from Königsberg
German male sport shooters
Olympic shooters of the United Team of Germany
Olympic shooters of West Germany
Olympic bronze medalists for the United Team of Germany
Shooters at the 1960 Summer Olympics
Shooters at the 1964 Summer Olympics
Shooters at the 1968 Summer Olympics
Medalists at the 1960 Summer Olympics
Olympic medalists in shooting
20th-century German people